Pritchardia is a genus of robber flies in the family Asilidae. There are about six described species in Pritchardia.

Species
These six species belong to the genus Pritchardia:
 Pritchardia boliviensis Scott L.Gardner, F.Agustín Jiménez & Mariel L.Campbelll, 2013 g
 Pritchardia curicoensis Artigas, 1970 c g
 Pritchardia hirtipes (Macquart, 1838) c
 Pritchardia lopesi Carrera & Papavero, 1965 c g
 Pritchardia puella Bromley, 1932 c g
 Pritchardia tertialis (Bromley, 1932) c g
Data sources: i = ITIS, c = Catalogue of Life, g = GBIF, b = Bugguide.net

References

Further reading

External links

 
 

Asilidae genera